The 1956 Oxford-Cambridge rugby union tour of Argentina was a series of matches played in Argentina, in Buenos Aires and Rosario in 1956.

A mixed selection, formed also of many international player of British national team, student at Oxford  and Cambridge universities was arranged for an historical tour, the second after the tours in 1948

Team

From Cambridge University 
 D. Richards, M. Kershaw, D. Marques, T. Hodgson, A. Herbert,  W. Downey, N. Raffle, W. Evans, A. Mulligan, D. Tarsh e J. Hetherington.

From Oxford University 
 : R. Allaway, M. J. K. Smith, P. Watson, J. Walker, John Currie, Peter Robbins, I. Reeler, R. Davies, T. Tallon, Onllwyn Brace, W. Lawrence, J. Abbot y A. Ramsay.

Referee: K. John.

Results 
Legend: ADF= Asociación Deportiva Francesa), BCR=Buenos Aires Cricket & Rugby Club, BAC=Belgrano Athletic Club, CASI=Club Atletico san Isidro, CP=Club Pucará, CUBA= Club Universitario de B.A., GE=Gimnasia y Esgrima H= Hindú Club, OG= Old Georgian Club ORC= Olivos Rugby Club, OS= Obras Sanitarias, PUY=PUY

Rosario: J. Dogliani; A. Drincovich, J. Arce (capt.), J. Vázquez, J. Gabutti; W. Villar, N. Robson; O. Kaden, J. Watson, O. Celentano. A, Colla, A. Pava]; R. Cerfoglio, N. Robson, J Madariaga.  
Oxford-Cambridge: J. Hetherington; M. Kershaw, J. Hodgson, I. Reeler, W. Lawrence; T. Richard, A. Mulligan; A. Herbert, P. Robbins, A. Ramsay; J. Currie, 11. Marques; P. Watson, R, Allaway, D. Tarsh. 

C.A. San Isidro:  E.Niño; H.Prebisch, M.Guyot, J.Berro García, C.Ramallo; J.Belgrano, F.Varela (capt.); L, Bavio, R.Ochoa, 1.Madero; R.Dell'Aqua, L.Allen; C.Travaglini, M.Iraola, R.Lagarde.
Oxford-Cambridge: J.Hetherington; M.Kershaw, I.Reeler, T, Fallon, J.Walker; T.Richards, D.Braco; W.Evana, A.Herbert, P, Robbins; J.Currie, R.Marques; P.Watson, R, Allaway, D, Tareh. 

 Belgrano: A.Forrester; C.Lennon, R.Bazán, E, Gahan, E.Horan; M.Hughes, P.Felisari; A.Halle, E, Arntsen, G Schon; A.Dillon, I.Diez; E.Hirsch, M.Caldwell, J.Lescano.
Oxford-Cambridge:  M.Smith; M.Kershaw, J, Hodgeon, J.Williams, J.Walker; T.Richards, A.Mulligan; R.Marques, R.Davies, P.Robbins; A.Herbert, J.Abbot; P.Wetson, N.Raffle, W.Downey. 

 Capital: R.Raimúndez (BCR) .; E.Horan (BAC), A.Dramis (OS), A.Yangüela (PUY), J.Ricciardello (PUY) ; A.Guastella, U, Propato (PUY) ; J.O'Farrel (CUBA (capt.); M.Azpiroz (OS), S.Hogg (BCR) ; B.Yustini (H), R, Dillon (BAC).E.Hirach (BAC), S.Alonso (GE), A.Azpiroz (OS).
Oxford-Cambridge:  J.Williams; M.Kershaw, I.Reeler, T.Fallon, J.Walker; M.Smith, D.Braco; A.Ramsay, W.Evans, R, Davies; J.Currie, J.Abbot; N.Raffle, R.Allaway, W.Downey.

 C.U.B.A.: J.Gencud; U.O'Farrell, E, Fernández del Casal (capt.), R.Lanusse, J Ferrer; F Mayol, G.Martínez Seeber; R Mihura, C.Álvarez, J.O'Farrell; A.Díaz Alberdi, A.Conen; E.Gaviña, H.Achaval, F.Chevalier Boutell.
Oxford-Cambridge:  M.Smith; M.Kershaw, T.Fallon, J.Hodgson, 1.Walker; T.Richards, D.Braco; A Herbert, R.Evans; P.Robbins.J.Currie, N.Marques; D, Tarah, R.Allaway, P.Watson, 

Argentina: J.Genoud (CUBA; O.Bernacchi (CP), E.Fernández del Canal (CUBA, R..Bazán (BAC), A.Salinas (ORC); J, M.Belgrano (CASI)  (capt.), P.Felisari (BAC); S.Hogg (BCR), E.Mitchelstein (ORC), R.Ochoa (CASI), R.Dell'Acqua (CASI), J.Diez (BAC); E.Gaviña (CUBA, M.Caldwell (BAC), R.Lagorde (CASI) .
Oxford-Cambridge:  M.Smith; J.Walker, I.Reeler, J.Hodgson, M, Kershaw; T.Richards, D.Brace; N.Marques, R.Davies; P.Robbins; A.Herbert, J.Currie; W.Watson, R.Allaway, W.Downey. 

 Provincia: R.Pesce (ADF); J.Márquez Miranda (Curupaytí), J.Guidi (ADF), L.Trotta (CP); C.Ramallo (CASI) ; I.Comas, G.Ehrman (capt.) (CP); E.Michelstein (ORC), M.Sarandón (SIC), J.Madero (CASI); E.Domínguez (CP), L.Allen (CASI) ; C.Travaglini (CASI), V.Christianson (ADF) R.Follet (OG).
Oxford-Cambridge:  T, Richards; W.Lawrence, T.Fallan, J.Hodgson, J.Walker; M.Smith, A.Mulligan; R.Marques, P.Robbins, W.Evana; A, Herbert, 1.Currie; N, Raffle, R.Allaway, W.Downey.

 Obras Sanitarias: J, Salmerón; R.Brown, A.Dermis, E.Dramis, P.Quiroga; W.Cassellini, Ant.Demis; M.Azpiroz, A.Bublath, J.Rossito; A.Echagüe, J, Wester; L Echagüe, E.Verzoletto, A.Azpiroz.
Oxford-Cambridge:  T.Richards; N.Lawrence, I.Reeler, T.Fallon, M.Kershaw; M.Smith, D.Brace; R Davies, A.Ramsay, J.Abbot; J.Currie, R.Marques; P.Watson, R..Allaway, N.Baffle 

 San Isidro Club: R.Devoto; J.Angelillo, F.Carlés, J.Álvarez, M.Fernández Criado; E.Elizalde, G.Soares Gache, M.Sarandón, M, Villalonga, R.Plá; L.Glastra, A.Lamas; B.Mugica, E.Jantus, R.Rodríguez Loredo.
Oxford-Cambridge: M Smith; W.Lawrence, I.Reeler, J, Hodgson, J.Walker; T.Richards, A.Mulligan; P.Robbins, R Davies, W.- Evans; J.Currie, R.Marques; P, Watson, N.Baffle, W.Downey. 

Argentina: J.Genoud (CUBA; O.Bernacchi (CP), E.Fernández del Casal (CUBA, A, Yangüela (PUY), E.Horan (BAC); A.Guastella, U.Propato (PUY) ; J.O'Farrel, cap.(CUBA, M.Azpiros (OS), S, Hogg (BCR); B.Yustfni (H), R.Dillon (BAC).E.Gaviña (CUBA, V.Christianson (ADF), E.Hirsch (BAC).
Oxford-Cambridge:  T.Richards; M Kershaw, I.Reeler, T.Hodgson, N.Lawrence; M.Smith, D.Brace: A.Ramsay, P.Robbins, R, Davies; J.Abbot, R, Marques; N.Raffle, R.Allaway, P.Watson.

Seven-a-side special 

On September 9, was played a tournament of "seven", with the participation of 23 teams of Argentinian clubs, and two selection of British played.

The final was played between the Oxford Cambridge "A" Club Pucará that won the preliminary matches.
Oxford Cambridge “A”won with Banco Nación (16-0), Pueyrredón (16-0), San Isidro Club (11-0)., while Pucará won with Atalaya (5-0), (Club Universitario (8-3), Buenos Aires C&R (5-3), Oxford-Cambridge “B” (16-0).

 Pucará: O.Bernacchi, A.Palma; I.Comas, L.Trotta; B.Otaño, F.Ibáñez, E.Domínguez  
Oxford-Cambridge A: N, Lawrence; M.Smith; T.Richards, D.Braco; R.Davies, N.Raffle, P.Robbins

Notes

External links 
 Union Argentrina de Rugby - Memorias 1956

Oxfrod-Cambridge
Osxford-Cambridge
Rugby union tours of Argentina
Oxford-Cambridge rugby union team tours
1956–57 in English rugby union